Florian Vermeersch (born 12 March 1999) is a Belgian professional racing cyclist, who currently rides for UCI WorldTeam .

Biography
On 1 June 2020, Vermeersch was promoted from the team's under-23 development squad. Formerly, Vermeersch competed in cyclo-cross, in which he was highly successful. While being a professional cyclist, he is studying history at Ghent University.
In 2021, he placed third in the UCI Road World Under–23 men's time trial. At the 2021 Paris–Roubaix race, which had been postponed from April due to the COVID-19 pandemic, he got into the early breakaway of around 30 riders and ultimately finished second to Sonny Colbrelli and ahead of Mathieu van der Poel in a three-man sprint in the velodrome.

Major results

Road

2019
 1st  Road race, National Under-23 Road Championships
 6th Gylne Gutuer
 7th Overall À travers les Hauts-de-France
 7th Hafjell TT
 10th Lillehammer GP
2020
 4th Brussels Cycling Classic
 5th Time trial, National Road Championships
 8th Giro della Toscana
 9th Overall BinckBank Tour
2021
 1st  Mountains classification, Tour de Wallonie
 2nd Paris–Roubaix
 3rd  Time trial, UCI Road World Under-23 Championships
 5th Time trial, National Road Championships
 8th Circuit de Wallonie
2022
 1st Antwerp Port Epic
 9th Grand Prix du Morbihan

Grand Tour general classification results timeline

Cyclo-cross

2015–2016
 1st Junior Grote Prijs Stad Eeklo
 Junior Bpost Bank Trophy
1st Flandriencross
2nd Waaslandcross
 Junior Superprestige
2nd Vlaamse Aardbeiencross
2nd Noordzeecross
2016–2017
 Junior DVV Trophy
1st Krawatencross
 1st Junior Zilvermeercross
 Junior Brico Cross
2nd Berencross
 3rd Junior Niels Albert

References

External links
 

1999 births
Living people
Belgian male cyclists
Sportspeople from Ghent
Cyclists from East Flanders